Naa Autograph Sweet Memories is a 2004 Indian Telugu-language romantic drama film directed by S. Gopal Reddy. The film stars Ravi Teja alongside Gopika, Bhumika Chawla, Mallika and Prakash Raj. Though the film had an above average run at the box office, with the years gone by it slowly gathered cult following due to its refreshing content, making and music. This film is a remake of the Tamil film Autograph. The film was also dubbed in Hindi as Thokar by Aditya Music India Pvt Ltd in 2012.

Plot
The film begins with Seenu, who works in an advertising agency in Hyderabad, setting off on a journey, distributing wedding invitations for his forthcoming wedding. Along the way, he encounters various individuals from his past, who bring back memories of three women who have affected his love life.

First, Seenu returns to his village in Andhra Pradesh where he spent his childhood. He remembers his childhood antics, his school and his first love Vimala. After finishing school, Vimala got married and she never met Seenu again. In the present day, Seenu invites everyone from his village for his wedding including his friends, his old school master and Vimala, her husband and her three children.

Then, Seenu goes to a village in Kerala where he moved after his father Sriram, a postmaster, was transferred there. He had his college education there. He was constantly bullied by the students there as he did not know Malayalam, but eventually managed to become friends with a fellow student Satyam, whose mother tongue was also Telugu. Satyam served him as a translator. Seenu soon fell in love with Lathika, a Malayali girl. Lathika too reciprocated his feelings and soon their relationship becomes intimate. However, when Lathika's family discovered this, they expelled Seenu's family from the village and had her marry a local youth who also liked her. In the present day, Seenu reunites with Satyam in Kerala and invites him for his wedding. When they arrive at Lathika's house to invite her too, Seenu becomes upset to see that his former love had become a widow (her husband had died in a boating accident a couple of years prior).

After being expelled from the village in Kerala, Seenu and his parents moved to Hyderabad. Seenu had not got over Lathika and became an emotional wreck, and started to smoke and drink. He remained an emotional wreck until he met Divya, who worked in an advertisement agency headed by one Prakash. Divya, in fact, secured this job for Seenu after she saw him and his friend Bhagavan distributing pamphlets to the passengers in a bus, seeking job opportunities, hoping one of them may help them out in finding a job. Soon Seenu and Divya became close friends and Divya instilled confidence, unearthed his hidden talents and taught him the lesson that one has to proceed in life without looking back. Soon, Divya revealed that her widowed mother was a paralytic patient and that she worked to take care of her mother. As time passes by, she reveals that she was in love with someone and believed that he was the man of her life, but he cheated her. After Divya's mother died, she goes to orphanage and she lives with the orphanage children to build their carrier successful.

Finally, Seenu decided to marry a girl of his parents choice, Sandhya, for which he is distributing invitations in the present day. Everyone he invited, including Vimala, Lathika and Divya, attend his wedding. The film ends with Seenu reflecting on his life's journey to the audience.

Cast

Soundtrack
Music by M. M. Keeravani.

Release 
The Hindu opined that Gopika "is the most attractive one in the film, because of the touch of tradition and [her] performance" and praised Keeravani's music.

References

External links

2004 films
2000s Telugu-language films
Films scored by M. M. Keeravani
Telugu remakes of Tamil films